Rososzyca  is a village in the administrative district of Gmina Sieroszewice, within Ostrów Wielkopolski County, Greater Poland Voivodeship, in west-central Poland. It is in the municipality of Sieroszewice.
The village has an approximate population of 1,000.

History

First recorded in 1377AD as a village, owned by the knight, Nicholas of Dóbr Klasztoru in Ołobok. From the end of the eighteenth century until 1928 it belonged to the Skórzewski family who in the nineteenth century built a palace here. Previously, the family Roso(w)ski of the Korab coat of arms, had owned it. Before the year 1887 the village belonged administratively to the Odolanowski county; from 1887 to 1975 and since 1999 to the Ostrów Wielkopolski County and in the years 1975-1998 it belonged directly to the Kalisz Voivodeship.

Tourist attractions
Skorzewski Palace, currently in ruins and the nearby park
Saint Mark church from 1818
19th century folwark buildings, including a granary
medieval ruins from 15-16th centuries near the palace

References

Rososzyca